Family of Spies, also known as Family of Spies: The Walker Spy Ring is a 1990 TV movie based on the espionage of John A. Walker Jr. The film was directed by Stephen Gyllenhaal and starred Powers Boothe as John Walker.

Plot

John A. Walker Jr. is a cryptologist with the US Navy on a sub. While he is away at sea his wife learns he has been unfaithful to her. He convinces her to stay with him and transfers to a shore post. Walker goes to the Soviet Embassy and agrees to become a spy for cash. He starts stealing secrets, but his wife becomes suspicious and learns what he's doing. The Navy also becomes suspicious because of the increased number of suspicious encounters between Soviet and American subs. Walker goes on a tour at sea and upon his return his wife threatens to shoot him. The Navy fakes a nuclear accident, which establishes that the Soviets are indeed getting inside info from the US Navy because of the way they react. When a Marine officer starts to get suspicious of him, Walker retires from the Navy. Walker recruits Jerry Whitworth, a navy radio operator into spying; telling him the info is going to Israel. Walker and his wife separate. John Walker's daughter joins the Army and he tries to recruit her as a spy, but she gets married, becomes pregnant and leaves the service. Walker becomes a private detective. Walker's son joins the Navy. Whitworth delivers a blurry roll of film because he wants more money. The Soviets think he has been turned and they try to kill Walker. Eventually Walker repairs his relationship with the Soviets. Walker recruits his son in the Navy as a spy. His ex-wife blackmails him into paying more so she won't tell. However, she finally calls the FBI and Walker's daughter confirms he tried to recruit her. After a lengthy investigation Walker, his son and Whitworth are arrested and sentenced to lengthy jail terms.

Cast
Powers Boothe as John A. Walker Jr.
Lesley Ann Warren as Barbara Walker
Lili Taylor as Laura Walker
Graham Beckel as Jerry Whitworth

External links

1990 television films
1990 films
American biographical films
American spy films
CBS network films
1990s American films